Dorothy Weston (21 February 1900 – 17 March 1998) was an Australian tennis player from the inter-war period.

She was twice a double ladies finalist at the Australian Championships in 1928 and 1932, each time alongside Kathleen Le Messurier.

In 1934 she was the South Australia singles champion.

Grand Slam finals

Doubles (2 runner-ups)

References

1900 births
1981 deaths
Australian female tennis players
Tennis people from South Australia
20th-century Australian women